Chen Chen (born March 9, 1989) is a Chinese-American poet. His book, When I Grow Up I Want to Be a List of Further Possibilities, has been longlisted for the 2017 National Book Awards. Chen has served as the Jacob Ziskind Poet-in-Residence at Brandeis University since 2018. He also serves on the poetry faculty for the low-residency MFA programs at New England College and Stonecoast.

Life 
Chen was born in Xiamen, China and grew up in Massachusetts. After graduating from Newton North High School, he received his B.A. in creative writing and Asian/Pacific/American Studies at Hampshire College in 2011, and his M.F.A. from Syracuse University in 2014. Chen completed his Ph.D. in English and creative writing at Texas Tech University, where he was a part-time instructor in composition.

His work has appeared in Poetry, The Massachusetts Review, Drunken Boat, Best of the Net, The Best American Poetry, The Academy of American Poets, and elsewhere. He has served as a poetry editor for Salt Hill Journal, and currently serves as editor-in-chief of Underblong and managing editor for Iron Horse Review. He also edits "the lickety split", a Twitter-based journal that "only publishes poems that fit in a single tweet", alongside his fictional assistant editor Gudetama the Egg.

Awards and fellowships 
 2019 National Endowment for the Arts Fellowship in Literature
2019 Pushcart Prize
2018 Thom Gunn Award for Gay Poetry
2018 Great Lakes Colleges Association (GLCA) New Writers Award
2018 Finalist, Lambda Literary Award for Gay Poetry
2017 Longlisted, National Book Award
 2016 Kundiman Fellow
 2015 Finalist, Poetry Foundation's Ruth Lilly and Dorothy Sargent Rosenberg Poetry Fellowships
 2014 New Delta Review's Matt Clark Award in Poetry
 2014 A. Poulin, Jr. Poetry Prize
 2014 Finalist, Narrative's 30 Below Contest
 2011 Joyce Carol Oates Award

Books 
 Your Emergency Contact Has Experienced an Emergency (New York: BOA Editions, forthcoming September 2022) 
 When I Grow Up I Want to be a List of Further Possibilities (New York: BOA Editions, 2017)
 Kissing the Sphinx (Two of Cups Press, 2016)
 Set the Garden on Fire (Porkbelly Press, 2015)

In anthology
 Ghost Fishing: An Eco-Justice Poetry Anthology (University of Georgia Press, 2018)

References 

American male poets
21st-century American poets
Chinese emigrants to the United States
American writers of Chinese descent
Writers from Massachusetts
American LGBT poets
American gay writers
American LGBT people of Asian descent
21st-century American male writers
Hampshire College alumni
Gay poets